Gordon Currie is a Canadian-American film and television actor, best known for his role as Nicolae Carpathia in the Left Behind films, and his role in horror films such as Puppet Master 4, Friday the 13th Part VIII: Jason Takes Manhattan and Blood and Donuts. Currie has also directed, written, and produced several films, and works in both the United States and Canada in television and film roles.

Early life
Currie was born in Vancouver, British Columbia, Canada to American parents. One of his first or breakthrough roles was playing Officer Palone on 21 Jump Street (1987). In 1991, after a couple of years working in locally shot TV and film in Vancouver, he moved to Los Angeles to study acting; his first roommate was Brad Pitt.

Career
Currie rented a two-bedroom flat off Melrose Avenue in California, where he lived for two years with roommate Brad Pitt. He worked for a while as a Ronald McDonald clown before moving on to roles on television and film, including two roles on Beverly Hills, 90210, playing both Bobby Walsh, Brandon's (Jason Priestley) and Brenda's (Shannen Doherty) wheelchair-using cousin, and the role of Danny Five, Colin's (Jason Wiles) cocaine dealer. In 1987, he received one of his first roles as Officer Palone on the series 21 Jump Street, episode "Two for the Road".  He played in Vancouver television and film roles, as well as roles in the Joel Schumacher film Cousins, Friday the 13th Part VIII: Jason Takes Manhattan, The Terror Within II, Puppet Master 4, Puppet Master 5: The Final Chapter, and My Blue Heaven (starring Steve Martin, Rick Moranis and Joan Cusack) before making the move to Los Angeles in 1991. Two years later, he had a supporting role in the Alive (1993 film)

His most prominent role has been that of Nicolae Carpathia in the series of films Left Behind, based on the series of best-selling books by Tim LaHaye and Jerry B. Jenkins. His character, Nicolae Carpathia, is the Antichrist, who attempts to marshal the forces of the Global Community against the followers of Christ.

Filmography

References

External links

Living people
Canadian people of American descent
Canadian male film actors
Canadian male television actors
Male actors from Vancouver
Year of birth missing (living people)